UFC on ESPN: Poirier vs. Hooker (also known as UFC on ESPN 12  and UFC Vegas 4) was a mixed martial arts event produced by the Ultimate Fighting Championship that took place on June 27, 2020 at the UFC Apex facility in Enterprise, Nevada, part of the Las Vegas Metropolitan Area, United States.

Background
The event was initially scheduled to take place at the Frank Erwin Center in Austin, Texas. Due to the COVID-19 pandemic, UFC president Dana White announced on April 9 that starting with UFC 249, all future events were indefinitely postponed. The event would have marked the promotion's fourth visit to Austin, following UFC Fight Night: Cowboy vs. Medeiros in February 2018. On May 21, the UFC announced the cancelation of the event in Austin.

A lightweight bout between former interim UFC Lightweight Champion Dustin Poirier and Dan Hooker headlined the event. The pairing was previously expected to headline an event on May 16 in San Diego, California. That event was effectively canceled on April 20, after the California State Athletic Commission (CSAC) extended a moratorium on combat sports events through May 31 due to the COVID-19 pandemic.

A women's flyweight bout between Alexa Grasso and Ji Yeon Kim was initially scheduled for this event. However, the bout was rescheduled and would take place on August 29 at UFC Fight Night: Smith vs. Rakić.

Ian Heinisch was expected to face Brendan Allen at the event. However, Heinisch pulled out of the matchup in mid-June citing injury and was replaced by promotional newcomer Kyle Daukaus.

A women's flyweight bout between former Invicta FC Flyweight Champion Jennifer Maia and Viviane Araújo was initially scheduled for this event. However, the bout was rescheduled in mid-June and moved to UFC Fight Night: Brunson vs. Shahbazyan on August 1 after both participants faced travel restrictions related to the COVID-19 pandemic.

A women's bantamweight bout between Aspen Ladd and former UFC Women's Bantamweight Championship challenger (also 2004 Olympic silver medalist in wrestling) Sara McMann was scheduled for the event. However, the bout was scrapped after Ladd suffered an injury and was forced to withdraw from the event, tearing both her anterior cruciate ligament (ACL) and medial collateral ligament (MCL) in training.

A catchweight bout between Sean Woodson and Kyle Nelson was scheduled for the event. However, Nelson was pulled from the event due to a visa issue and replaced by Julian Erosa.

A women's flyweight bout between Miranda Maverick and Mara Romero Borella was scheduled for the event. However, Maverick was forced to pull out due to injury and the bout was scrapped.

Ramiz Brahimaj was scheduled to face Takashi Sato at the event. However, Brahimaj was pulled from the fight during the week leading up to the event in an abundance of caution, after a cornerman of his tested positive for COVID-19. Promotional newcomer Jason Witt stepped in as a replacement to face Sato.

Results

Bonus awards
The following fighters received $50,000 bonuses.
Fight of the Night: Dustin Poirier vs. Dan Hooker
Performance of the Night: Julian Erosa and Kay Hansen

Reported payout
The following is the reported payout to the fighters as reported to the Nevada State Athletic Commission (NSAC). It does not include sponsor money and also does not include the UFC's traditional "fight night" bonuses. The total disclosed payout for the event was $1,140,000.

 Dustin Poirier: $300,000 (includes $150,000 win bonus) def. Dan Hooker: $110,000
 Mike Perry: $180,000 (includes $90,000 win bonus) def. Mickey Gall: $50,000
 Maurice Greene: $60,000 (includes $30,000 win bonus) def. Gian Villante: $75,000
 Brendan Allen: $28,000 (includes $14,000 win bonus) def. Kyle Daukaus: $12,000
 Takashi Sato: $28,000 (includes $14,000 win bonus) def. Jason Witt: $12,000
 Julian Erosa: $28,000 (includes $14,000 win bonus) def. Sean Woodson: $12,000
 Khama Worthy: $28,000 (includes $14,000 win bonus) def. Luis Peña: $27,000
 Tanner Boser: $24,000 (includes $12,000 win bonus) def. Philipe Lins: $80,000
 Kay Hansen: $28,000 (includes $14,000 win bonus) def. Jinh Yu Frey: $14,000
 Youssef Zalal: $24,000 (includes $12,000 win bonus) def. Jordan Griffin: $20,000

Aftermath
On August 5, it was announced that the NSAC issued a temporary suspension for Luis Peña, after he tested positive for marijuana in his pre-fight screenings. On September 3, the NSAC announced that Peña was suspended four and a half months and fined 15% of his fight purse. The reduced suspension was due to his fight being taken on short notice.

See also 

 List of UFC events
 List of current UFC fighters
 2020 in UFC

References 

UFC on ESPN
2020 in sports in Texas
Mixed martial arts in Texas
Sports in Austin, Texas
2020 in sports in Nevada
Mixed martial arts in Las Vegas
Sports competitions in Las Vegas
June 2020 sports events in the United States
2020 in mixed martial arts